Little Britain Live is a stage show based on the TV sketch series Little Britain, performed by its stars, David Walliams and Matt Lucas, and directed by Jeremy Sams. Supporting characters are played by Paul Putner and Samantha Power (with Anthony Head and Ruth Jones in certain performances). As in the TV show, Tom Baker is the narrator, although his lines are pre-recorded. The show toured the United Kingdom and Ireland from October 2005 until December 2006, and Australia from January–March 2007.

Development
In an interview in the show's program, Lucas and Walliams state that they had always wanted Little Britain to be a radio programme, a television series and live stage show.

After production of the third series of the television show, the duo settled down to write and plan the show. In rehearsals, the sketches were tweaked, re-ordered and re-written in order to accommodate the rapid costume and make-up changes required by the principal performers. To remove the need for stagehands to make set and prop changes, an elaborate stage floor was designed with track lines for the props. Sets were projected onto the background of the stage, with computer animated transitions designed by video and lighting designer Willie Williams.

Certain sketches required elaborate technical mechanisms, such as the vomit machine for the Judy and Maggie "Village Fete" sketch, and oversized props for the Dennis Waterman sketch.

During the show's UK run, several sketches were rewritten to improve the pacing, or removed in cases where the sketch was the same as the TV series.

Performances
The show's run began at the Portsmouth Guildhall in Portsmouth, Hampshire on 23 October 2005. The show toured for 49 performances in 18 cities: Bournemouth, Southend, Plymouth, Sheffield, Manchester, Nottingham, Glasgow, Edinburgh, Newcastle, Liverpool, Oxford, Bristol, Ipswich, Birmingham, Blackpool, Brighton and ending in Manchester on 20 December.

Lucas and Walliams took a month off, before resuming the UK tour and returning to the previously-toured cities. A month-long residency at the Hammersmith Apollo in London in October and November 2006 followed, with two shows at the Brixton Academy. There were 3 live shows in Ireland during the summer of 2006, shown at the Point Theatre in Dublin. The show was eventually seen by nearly one million people on its UK tour from November 2005 to December 2006. Little Britain Live toured Australia in early 2007. Initial bookings were made in Sydney, with other cities added as ticket sales soared. Eventually the show sold out six performances in Melbourne and Brisbane, seven in Sydney and Perth, and two in Adelaide. Performances were also held in Canberra, Newcastle and Wollongong.

Show order

Act 1
 Lou Todd and Andy Pipkin – "Welcome"
 Emily Howard and Florence Rose – "Plumber"
 Carol Beer – "Disneyworld"
 Dudley Punt and Ting Tong – "Dudley in Hospital"
 Kenny Craig – "Engagement Ring"
 Ray McCooney – "Paying the Bill"
 Vicky Pollard – "Assembly"
 Des Kaye – "Hide the Sausage"
 Maggie Blackamoor and Judy Pike – "Village Fete"

Act 2
 Anne – "Stars in Their Eyes" – "Whitney Houston's The Greatest Love of All" (guest star Natalie Brown)
 Bubbles DeVere – "Bank"
 Sir Norman Fry – "Press Statement"
 Mr Mann – "Roy's Paint Shop"
 Linda Flint – "Chewbacca", "Blind Dave", "Fiddler on the Roof"
 Dennis Waterman – "Celebrity Big Brother"
 Marjorie Dawes – "Game for New Members", "Audience Weigh-in"
 Mrs Emery – "Greengrocer"
 Sebastian Love and Michael – "Separation"

Encore
 Daffyd Thomas – "I'm Gay" song

Variations
Anthony Head (as the Prime Minister) and Ruth Jones (as barmaid Myfanwy) reprised their roles for certain performances, also appearing as backup dancers during Daffyd's song. Head appeared in three performances in Birmingham (5–6 May, 9 December), two in Blackpool (8–9 May), during the show's London run, Cardiff (7 December), Melbourne (30 January – 2 February) and Sydney (3–5 February). Jones appeared in Blackpool (and hence on the DVD), Cardiff, and during the London run.

A special version of the stage show featuring several celebrity guests was performed at the Hammersmith Apollo in London on 22 November 2006, and was shown by the BBC on 16 March 2007 as part of Comic Relief. Celebrity performers included Kate Moss as Vicky Pollard's sister Katie, Dawn French as lesbian barmaid Myfanwy, and the real Dennis Waterman who appeared to sing the Minder "feem toon" with his pint-sized counterpart. The show also featured cameo appearances from Russell Brand, Patsy Kensit, Kate Thornton and DJ Chris Moyles.

Several sketches are adjusted to reflect local content, such as the locality referred to as a 'shithole' by travel agent Carol Beer (Preston in Blackpool, Bolton in Manchester, Wolverhampton or Chelmsley Wood in Birmingham, Derby in Nottingham, Strabane in Belfast, Shepherd's Bush in London, Broadmeadows in Melbourne, Elizabeth in Adelaide, Balga in Perth, Ipswich in Brisbane, Sunderland in Tyne and Wear, Dapto in Wollongong and Charnwood in Canberra), or retail outlets frequented by Vicky Pollard. In Australia, Lucas and Walliams were assisted by local comedians such as Gina Riley and Jane Turner (creators of Kath & Kim) for Melbourne references and Andrew Denton for Sydney.

The Des Kaye and Marjorie Dawes sketches include audience participation, with members of the audience invited on-stage to take part in a game of 'Hide the Sausage' with Des, or participate in a 'weigh-in' with Marjorie.

Tour dates

Festivals and other miscellaneous performances
Bulmers International Comedy Festival

Cancellations and rescheduled shows

Official releases

DVD
The 9 May performance at the Blackpool Opera House was recorded and released on DVD in the UK (Region 2) and Australia (Region 4). The UK DVD was released on 13 November 2006 in a standard edition format and a special edition format (which included a miniature tour programme).

Also included on the DVD released in Australia (6 December 2006) and in the UK was 'Little Britain's Big Swim' which featured David Walliams swimming the English Channel.

"I'm Gay" single
Daffyd Thomas's song "I'm Gay" was recorded in a studio and released as an Internet-only single on the UK and Australian iTunes Stores.

Comic Relief does Little Britain Live
This is a night of Little Britain Live with celebrity guests such as Kate Moss and Peter Kay. £3 from each DVD sale goes to Comic Relief. A live Little Britain show was made for Comic Relief at the Hammersmith Apollo on 22 November 2006, and featured many guest artists and celebrities. This version was released in March 2007 and televised as part of Comic Relief: The Big One. It was later included as a bonus feature on the Little Britain Abroad DVD.

Guest artists included:
Kate Moss as Vicky Pollard's twin sister.
Dawn French as Myfanwy in the Daffyd Thomas sketch.
Russell Brand as a cross-dressing plumber who comes out to "fellow cross dresser", Emily Howard.
Jonathan Ross as the celebrity guest that Judy vomits on at the village fête.
Chris Moyles as an overweight victim of Marjorie's Fat Fighters club.
Dennis Waterman as himself, complaining about his portrayal in the Dennis Waterman sketch, then proceeds to sing the theme tune to Minder.
Peter Kay as wheelchair-using Brian Potter.
David Baddiel as a member of the audience brought onstage.
Jeremy Edwards as a molested contestant of Des Kaye's "Hide the Sausage" game
Patsy Kensit as a girl with hairy armpits who went to seek advice from Linda Flint.
Kate Thornton as the presenter of Stars in Their Eyes, introducing Anne.

References

External links
Official Australian Tour Website

Little Britain
Touring theatre
Comedy tours